The men's single sculls competition at the 1992 Summer Olympics in Barcelona was held from 27 July to 1 August at Lake of Banyoles. The event was an open-style, individual rowing event conducted as part of the Rowing at the 1992 Summer Olympics programme. There were 22 competitors from 22 nations, with each nation limited to a single boat in the event. The event was won by Thomas Lange of Germany, the fourth man to successfully repeat as Olympic champion (after his victory in 1988 on the East German team). It was the first appearance of "Germany" since 1936 (when Gustav Schäfer won the gold medal), though German rowers representing the United Team of Germany, West Germany, and East Germany had won 10 medals in 8 Games from 1960 to 1988. Václav Chalupa of Czechoslovakia took silver, that nation's first medal in the men's single sculls. Poland's Kajetan Broniewski earned that nation's first medal in the event since 1960 with his bronze.

Background

This was the 21st appearance of the event. Rowing had been on the programme in 1896 but was cancelled due to bad weather. The single sculls has been held every time that rowing has been contested, beginning in 1900.

Six of the 22 single scullers from the 1988 Games returned: gold medallist Thomas Lange of East Germany (now competing for unified Germany), bronze medalist Eric Verdonk of New Zealand, fifth-place finisher Kajetan Broniewski of Poland, seventh-place finisher (and three-time gold medalist from 1976 to 1984) Pertti Karppinen of Finland, eighth-place finisher Jüri Jaanson of the Soviet Union (now competing for Estonia), and eleventh-place finisher Jesus Posse of Uruguay. Lange was favoured to repeat, but there was a strong field. Lange had won the 1989 and 1991 World Championships, while Jaanson had won in 1990. Václav Chalupa of Czechoslovakia had been the runner-up all three years, as well as winning the 1989 Diamond Challenge Sculls. Joaquín Gómez of Mexico was the Pan American champion. Verdonk was also a Diamond Challenge winner in 1990. 

Latvia, Lebanon, and Turkey each made their debut in the event; some former Soviet republics competed together as the Unified Team. The United States made its 17th appearance, most among nations.

Competition format

This rowing event was a single scull event, meaning that each boat was propelled by a single rower. The "scull" portion means that the rower used two oars, one on each side of the boat. The course used the 2000 metres distance that became the Olympic standard in 1912. 

The tournament used the four-round format (three main rounds and a repechage) that had been used since 1968. The competition continued to use the six-boat heat standardised in 1960. The ranking races expanded from the "B" final for ranking 7th through 12th place introduced in 1964 to having four finals, "D" through "A", that ranked every boat. Additional "C/D" or consolation semifinals were added as well.

 Quarterfinals: Four heats of 5 or 6 boats each. The top boat in each heat (4 total) advanced directly to the "A/B" semifinals. The remaining boats (18 total) went to the repechage.
 Repechage: Four heats of 4 or 5 boats each. The top two boats in each heat (8 total) rejoined the quarterfinal winners in the "A/B" semifinals. The other boats (10 total) went to the "C/D" semifinals, where they were no longer competing for medals.
 Semifinals: Four semifinals. Two "A/B" semifinals of 6 boats each for boats still in contention for medals; the top three boats in each heat (6 total) advanced to Final A, the remaining boats (6 total) went to Final B. Two "C/D" semifinals were used to sort remaining boats into ranking finals with no chance of medals; the top three boats in each heat (6 total) went to Final C while the remaining boats (4 total) went to Final D.
 Final: Four finals. Final A consisted of the top 6 boats. Final B placed boats 7 through 12. Final C placed boats 13 through 18. Final D placed boats 19 through 22.

Schedule

All times are Central European Summer Time (UTC+2)

Results

Quarterfinals

The winner of each heat is qualified for the "A/B" semifinals. 2nd–6th placed rowers advance to the repechage round.

Quarterfinal 1

Quarterfinal 2

Quarterfinal 3

Quarterfinal 4

Repechage

The first two of each heat qualified for the "A/B" semifinals. 3rd–5th placed rowers advanced to the "C/D" (consolation) semifinals.

Repechage heat 1

Repechage heat 2

Repechage heat 3

Repechage heat 4

Semifinals

For the Semifinals A/B, the top three of each heat advanced to Final A and 4th–6th placed rowers advanced to Final B.

For the Semifinals C/D, the top three of each heat advanced to Final C and 4th–5th placed rowers advanced to Final D.

Semifinal C/D 1

Semifinal C/D 2

Semifinal A/B 1

Semifinal A/B 2

Finals

Final D

Final C

Final B

Final A

Results summary

References

Rowing at the 1992 Summer Olympics
Men's events at the 1992 Summer Olympics